McClamrock is a surname. Notable people with the surname include:

John McClamrock (1956–2008), American football player and tetraplegic
Ron McClamrock, American philosophy academic